USS Velocipede (SP-1258) was a United States Navy patrol vessel in commission from 1917 to 1919.

Velocipede was built as a private motorboat of the same name in 1917 by the Charles L. Seabury Company at Morris Heights in the Bronx, New York, for K. C. Atwood, Jr., of New York City. Atwood had her built to a design that would make her useful as a naval patrol boat and planned to make her available to the U.S. Navy for use in the event of war.  Accordingly, the U.S. Navy acquired her under a free lease from Atwood on 27 October 1917 for use as a section patrol boat during World War I. She was commissioned as USS Velocipede (SP-1258) on 14 November 1917.

Assigned to the 7th Naval District for use as a "aeronautical patrol boat," Velocipede served on patrol duties at Naval Air Station Miami at Miami, Florida, until after the end of World War I.

The Navy returned Velocipede to Atwood on 6 February 1919.

Notes

References 

Department of the Navy Naval History and Heritage Command Online Library of Selected Images: U.S. Navy Ships: USS Velocipede (SP-1258), 1917–1919. Originally the civilian motor boat Velocipede (1917)
NavSource Online: Section Patrol Craft Photo Archive Velocipede (SP 1258)

Patrol vessels of the United States Navy
World War I patrol vessels of the United States
Ships built in Morris Heights, Bronx
1917 ships